Disney Channel Holiday  is a 2007 holiday album released on October 16, 2007. The album features musical artists associated or popularized by Disney Channel singing their own versions of holiday songs. Some songs were recorded prior to the production of this album, while others were recorded specifically for it.
In Canada, the album was released as  Family Holiday, as the Family Channel is the Canadian replacement for Disney Channel. The album made a peak of #32 on the Billboard 200, and as of January, 2008 the album has sold about 200,000+ copies.  In Brazil the album was released one year after release in United States.

Production
Although the majority of the songs were recorded specifically for the album, some songs were recorded prior to the album's production. Ashley Tisdale released "Last Christmas" as a single in 2006, the same year that Miley Cyrus performed "Rockin' Around the Christmas Tree" at the Magic Kingdom Christmas Day Parade. Also in 2006, Aly & AJ released "Greatest Time of Year" as a single from their album Acoustic Hearts of Winter as well as to promote the then-recent film The Santa Clause 3: The Escape Clause. Monique Coleman performed a cover of Christmas Vacation the titular theme song of the 1989 Chevy Chase film National Lampoon's Christmas Vacation. On November 24, 2007, at 7:00pm, the CD was released on Radio Disney. The event was hosted by Drew Seeley, who sings a song on the CD as well.
Ashley Tisdale and Corbin Bleu performed their songs from the album at the Macy's Thanksgiving Day Parade 2007. A music video for Corbin Bleu's "This Christmastime" premiered on Disney Channel in December 2007.

Track listing

References

Christmas compilation albums
2007 Christmas albums
Pop compilation albums
2007 compilation albums
Teen pop albums
Pop rock compilation albums
Walt Disney Records compilation albums
Walt Disney Records Christmas albums
Disney Channel albums
Pop rock Christmas albums